Nicola Molè (26 February 1931 – 17 January 2023) was an Italian lawyer and politician. A member of the Social Christians and the Democrats of the Left, he served as president of the Province of Terni from 1995 to 1999.

Molè died in Terni on 17 January 2023, at the age of 91.

References

1931 births
2023 deaths
Italian lawyers
Democratic Party of the Left politicians
Democratic Party (Italy) politicians
Presidents of the Province of Terni
Sapienza University of Rome alumni